Kevork S. Hovnanian (1923 – September 24, 2009) was an Armenian-American businessman and home builder, who founded Hovnanian Enterprises in 1959. He remained the president and chief executive officer of Hovnanian Enterprises until his retirement in 1997. Despite some recent financial difficulties due to the 2008-2009 recession and financial crisis, Hovnanian Enterprises remains the sixth largest American homebuilder and the largest homebuilder in New Jersey, as of September 2009.

Biography
Kevork Hovnanian was born in Kirkuk, present-day Iraq, in 1923. He was the oldest of four sons born to Stepan K. Hovnanian, a refugee from Armenia who had settled in Iraq. Stepan Hovnanian operated a construction business in Kirkuk which held contracts with oil companies in the region.

Career
Hovnanian took over the family's construction business after his father became ill.  The company eventually employed more than 12,000 people in Iraq. However, Hovnanian fled to the United States in the aftermath of the 1958 Iraqi Revolution, which overthrew the monarchy of Faisal II of Iraq. Most of his family also moved to the United States.

In 1959, Kevork and his three brothers - Hirair Hovnanian, Jirair Hovnanian and Vahak Hovnanian - each contributed $1,000 dollars, in addition to $20,000 which they borrowed from Peter S. Vosbikian (d.1971), to found Hovnanian Enterprises, Inc. in a trailer in Toms River, New Jersey. Hirair, Jirair and Vahak left the company by 1969 to found their own enterprises. Hovnanian and his company earned a reputation for selling low cost condos and townhouses, many to first time young homeowners and families. A typical two-bedroom, two bathroom Hovnanian home built in the early 1980s cost approximately $30,000 because Hovnanian eliminated amenities such as communal swimming pools, which other builders used to attract potential buyers. In a New York Times interview in 1983, Hovnanian explained his reasoning for marketing low cost homes in developments without community amenities, "There are limited recreation facilities going in because people have little time for socialization."

Hovnanian Enterprises had built and sold more than 30,000 homes and condos by 1989. An additional 200,000 residences were sold between 1989 and 2009, as the company expanded its construction to include luxury homes, mid-priced homes and retirement communities. It remains one the United States' largest builders of "active adult homes", which are sold under the name of Four Seasons communities.

Kevork Hovnanian stepped down as president of Hovnanian Enterprises in 1989, and was succeeded by his son, Ara K. Hovnanian. He remained chief executive until his retirement in 1997, and was also replaced as CEO by Ara Hovnanian. However, he remained the chairman of the company's board of directors until his death in 2009.

The company relocated its corporate headquarters to a new building on the banks of the Navesink River in Red Bank, New Jersey, in 2006.

Philanthropy

Hovnanian left a number of philanthropic contributions during his life, especially in support of New Jersey, Armenia and the Armenian diaspora. Much the focus of his philanthropy focused on medical facilities and hospitals. His contributions included the  K. Hovnanian Pavilion at the Alton A. Hovnanian Emergency Care Center at Riverview Medical Center in Red Bank and the K. Hovnanian Children's Hospital at Jersey Shore University Medical Center in Neptune, New Jersey. He also contributed donations to New York Presbyterian Hospital in New York City, which honored its benefactor by naming its cardiology practice unit for the K. Hovnanian family.

Hovnanian donated a townhouse in New York City for use as the official Armenian Mission to the United Nations. Hovnanian also constructed homes for earthquake victims in Armenia.

In 1986, Hovnanian constructed the St. Stepanos Armenian Church in the Elberon section of Long Branch in honor of his mother. The construction of the church fulfilled a promise he had made to himself when he fled Iraq in the late-1950s.

Later life
Hovnanian resided in Rumson, New Jersey.

Kevork Hovnanian died on September 24, 2009, at New York Presbyterian Hospital in New York City at the age of 86. His memorial service was held at St. Vartan Cathedral in Manhattan on October 3, 2009. The service was presided over by Archbishop Khajag Barsamian.

Legacy
He was survived by his wife of 60 years, Sirwart (Emily);  daughters, Sossie Najarian, Esto Barry and Lucy Kalian and Nadia Rodriguez; and son, Ara Hovnanian. He was also survived by two of his brothers, Hirair and Vahak, both of whom live in Middletown, New Jersey, and 13 grandchildren.

The president of the New Jersey Builders Association, Michael H. Karmatz, called Hovnanian an "industry vanguard" following his death.

References

1923 births
2009 deaths
American construction businesspeople
20th-century Iraqi businesspeople
Home builders
Iraqi emigrants to the United States
People from Rumson, New Jersey
People from Kirkuk
American people of Armenian descent
Iraqi people of Armenian descent
20th-century American philanthropists
20th-century American businesspeople